Aidan Butler (born 1974) is an Irish hurler who played as a midfielder for the Tipperary senior team.

Butler made his senior championship debut as a substitute versus Kerry during the 1996 championship. and made his final appearance in the county senior colours during the 2003 championship. During that time he won a senior All-Ireland winners' medal as a non-playing substitute.

At club level Buter is a one-time county club championship medallist with Clonoulty–Rossmore GAA.

References

1975 births
Living people
Clonoulty-Rossmore hurlers
Tipperary inter-county hurlers
Hurling goalkeepers